Sipsey Fork is an unincorporated community in Monroe County, Mississippi.

The community takes its name from nearby Sipsey Creek.

References

Unincorporated communities in Monroe County, Mississippi
Unincorporated communities in Mississippi
Mississippi placenames of Native American origin